This is a list of busiest London Underground stations for the 2019 calendar year. The dataset for the year was the last to show typical patterns of mobility prior to the COVID-19 pandemic in the United Kingdom, with many major central London stations dropping in the ranking the following year.

The London Underground is a rapid transit system in the United Kingdom that serves London and the neighbouring counties of Essex, Hertfordshire and Buckinghamshire. Its first section opened in 1863. The system had 270 stations in 2019. In 2019, King's Cross St Pancras was the busiest station on the network, used by over 88.27 million passengers, while Kensington (Olympia) was the least used, with 109,430 passengers. Data for 2019 was published on 1 April 2020 and was revised on 29 May 2020.

This table shows the busiest stations with over 33 million entries and exits in 2019.

See also
List of busiest London Underground stations for the 2021 data
List of busiest London Underground stations (2020)
List of London Underground stations
List of busiest railway stations in Great Britain (2019–20)

Notes

References

Busiest London Underground stations
Busiest London Underground stations